The Coty American Fashion Critics' Awards (awarded 1943–1984) were created in 1942 by the cosmetics and perfume company Coty, Inc. to promote and celebrate American fashion, and encourage design during the Second World War. In 1985, the Coty Awards were discontinued with the last presentation of the awards in September 1984; the CFDA Awards fulfill a similar role. It was casually referred to as "fashion's Oscars" because it once held great importance within the fashion industry and the award ceremonies were glitzy galas.

History
The Coty Awards were conceived and created by Coty, Inc. Executive Vice President, Jean Despres, founder of The Fragrance Foundation and FiFi Awards, and Grover Whalen (a member of the New York City Mayor's Committee, and president of the 1939 New York World's Fair). The fashion publicist  Eleanor Lambert was employed to promote and produce the awards. 

The awards were given solely to designers based in America, unlike the Neiman Marcus Fashion Awards. Until its discontinuation in 1985, the Coty Award was considered one of the most prestigious awards in the field of fashion. The awards were designed by Malvina Hoffman. The womenswear awards are popularly known as Winnies; the menswear award which began in 1968 has no name. Repeat awards were the Return Award and the Hall of Fame award. Special Awards were also awarded to designers in specialist fields.

The popularity of this award began to decline in the late 1970s due to perceived commercial interests by the parent company. In 1979, designers Calvin Klein and Halston announced they would no longer accept the Winnie award. The same year, in 1979, Coty released the Coty Awards make up kit in order to profit off of the awards ceremony, which was perceived by the fashion designers to have cheapened the event. The newly founded Council of Fashion Designers of America (CFDA) appeared more democratic in ideology and began to compete with the Coty Award by 1980 with the CFDA Awards.

In June 1985, Donald Flannery, the senior vice-president of Pfizer, Inc., Coty's parent company, announced that since the awards had successfully brought America into the worldwide fashion scene, it was decided to discontinue them.

Recipients of the award

1943–1949

1950–1959

1960–1969

1970–1979

1980–1984

See also

 List of fashion awards

References

External links
 Coty Homepage
 "Coty marks 100 years, taking time to smell success" – Associated Press article

Fashion awards
American fashion
Awards established in 1943
1943 establishments in the United States
Awards disestablished in 1984
1984 disestablishments in the United States
Coty Inc.